Richard Stephen Tabaracci (born January 2, 1969) is a Canadian former professional ice hockey goaltender.

Biography
As a youth, Tabaracci played in the 1982 Quebec International Pee-Wee Hockey Tournament with the Toronto Young Nationals minor ice hockey team.

Drafted 26th overall in the 1987 NHL Entry Draft by the Pittsburgh Penguins, Tabaracci also played for the Winnipeg Jets, Washington Capitals, Calgary Flames, Tampa Bay Lightning, Atlanta Thrashers, and Colorado Avalanche. He appeared in 286 NHL games between 1989 and 1999.  Tabaracci represented Canada three times at the IIHF World Championships, winning a gold medal in 1997.

Career statistics

Regular season and playoffs

References

External links

1969 births
Living people
Atlanta Thrashers players
Calgary Flames players
Canadian ice hockey goaltenders
Canadian people of Italian descent
Chicago Wolves (IHL) players
Cleveland Lumberjacks players
Colorado Avalanche players
Cornwall Royals (OHL) players
Ice hockey people from Toronto
Moncton Hawks players
Muskegon Lumberjacks players
Orlando Solar Bears (IHL) players
Pittsburgh Penguins draft picks
Pittsburgh Penguins players
Portland Pirates players
Tampa Bay Lightning players
Utah Grizzlies (IHL) players
Winnipeg Jets (1979–1996) players
Washington Capitals players
Canadian expatriate ice hockey players in the United States